The Philippine House Special Committee on Southern Tagalog Development is a special committee of the Philippine House of Representatives.

Jurisdiction 
As prescribed by House Rules, the committee's jurisdiction is on the development of the Southern Tagalog area inclusive of those affecting agricultural areas, tourism, economic and industrial estates and processing areas therein.

Members, 19th Congress

Historical Members

18th Congress

See also 
 House of Representatives of the Philippines
 List of Philippine House of Representatives committees

References

External links 
House of Representatives of the Philippines

Southern Tagalog Development
Luzon